Felipe Pazos Roque (September 27, 1912 – February 26, 2001) was a Cuban economist who initially supported the Cuban Revolution of Fidel Castro, but became disillusioned with the increasingly radical nature of the revolutionary government. Born in Havana, Pazos earned a doctorate from the University of Havana in 1938. He was a member of the Cuban delegation to the 1944 Bretton Woods conference. In 1946, he joined the staff of the fledgling International Monetary Fund that had been established at the Bretton Woods conference. He worked there for three years before returning to Cuba in 1950 to head the newly established National Bank of Cuba for two years at the behest of Cuban President Carlos Prío Socarrás.

After Fulgencio Batista took power in Cuba through a military coup d'état in 1952, Pazos became active in supporting the resistance against Batista. Batista's rule came under increasing assault during the 1950s, and he and the Cuban military soon found themselves fighting against a young Castro and the forces of his 26th of July Movement. At the time, Castro was waging a guerrilla campaign in the mountainous Sierra Maestra region of Cuba. Batista had declared that Castro had been killed; however, Pazos arranged for The New York Times reporter Herbert Matthews to come and meet Castro in February 1957. The resulting interview refuted Batista's claims, and gave Castro and his revolutionaries international attention. In July 1957, Castro convened a meeting in the Sierra Maestra between his group of rebels and pro-Capitalist representatives, including Pazos. Pazos' signature on the July 12 Sierra Manifesto was meant to help reassure the Cuban people that the revolutionaries were not radical ideologues. Pazos and his family were forced to flee Cuba soon after its release.

After Castro's victory in 1959, Pazos returned to Cuba and once again headed the National Bank of Cuba. However, he soon found himself becoming increasingly disillusioned with the new Cuban government. In April 1959, Castro and his aides, including Pazos, visited the United States. Many had suspected that the purpose of the visit was to ask for economic aid, but Castro forbade  Pazos from making any such requests. Pazos privately expressed his frustrations to officials at the U.S. State Department and Treasury Department.

Pazos' confidence was further weakened when Castro ordered the arrest and imprisonment in October 1959 of Huber Matos, an anti-Communist revolutionary who had recently resigned from office. After Castro angrily denounced the United States for being complicit in the "bombing" of Havana with thousands of anti-Castro leaflets by the ex-Air Force Chief Pedro Luis Diaz Lanz, Pazos decided to resign. He tendered his resignation to President Osvaldo Dorticós Torrado on October 23, 1959. Pazos transferred the Presidency of the National Bank of Cuba to Che Guevara on November 26, 1959, and was allowed to leave Cuba soon afterward.

Pazos ended up working at the Alliance for Progress and the Inter-American Development Bank, writing many economic articles on Latin America, before retiring in 1975 to Venezuela. He died in Puerto Ordaz. He had three sons and a daughter. His son Felipe starred alongside Spencer Tracy in the 1958 film adaptation of Ernest Hemingway's The Old Man and the Sea.

References
Falcoff, Mark (Winter 1994). "Cuba and the United States: Back to the beginning". World Affairs, Volume 156, Issue 3.

Hispanic Foundation, Library of Congress (1966). National Directory of Latin Americanists: Bibliographies of 1,884 Specialists in the Social Sciences & Humanities. Washington, D.C.: Superintendent of Documents, U.S. Government Printing Office.
Lewis, Paul (March 9, 2001). "Felipe Pazos, 88, Economist; Cuban Split Early With Castro". The New York Times. Retrieved on December 28, 2007.

1912 births
2001 deaths
President of the Central Bank of Cuba
Cuban revolutionaries
Cuban economists
Cuban emigrants to Venezuela